The Museum of Contemporary Art of Georgia (MOCA GA) is a contemporary art museum in Atlanta, Georgia. The museum collects and archives contemporary works by Georgia artists. MOCA GA uses its exhibition schedule to  increase its permanent collection. The Education/Resource Center houses the museum's historical archive collection.

History
MOCA GA was co-founded in 2000 by David S. Golden and Annette Cone-Skelton as the result of an idea the co-founders first presented in 1989. Annette Cone-Skelton's artist background and David S. Golden's position as the President of CGR Advisors (private real estate investment firm) led them to the idea for a contemporary art museum for the state of Georgia. Prior to MOCA GA, the city was bereft of any major institutions devoted to collecting and showcasing the work made since WWII by regional artists. MOCA GA was founded to fill in this historical gap. Its primary focus was to give Georgia artists a place of their own and to protect and archive the history of the state. They believed in Georgia artists and wanted to build the finest collection possible. As the collection grew, the co-founders then established a museum to house the collection.

Established with private funding, MOCA GA began by housing the collections of Atlanta-based CGR Advisors—  a real estate advisory company and Mr Golden's personal collection. The museum's first location was at 1447 Peachtree Street in Atlanta, Georgia. The combined collection featured more than 250 works by 110 Georgia artists and includes a variety of mediums—  paintings, prints, sculpture, photography, and installation pieces which included bold color lithographs made by Trena Banks and others, as well as composed photographs by John McWilliams, Virginia Warren Smith, and others.

When the burgeoning collection needed more space, the CGR Advisors decided to relocate. They considered selling or giving the collections to various groups, but the gap that existed in showcasing Georgia Artists was too large. Annette Cone-Skelton searched for a model of this type of museum but there was none quite like the one they needed:  a model whose focus was contemporary art from the state in which it was located. The state of Georgia was in need of this type of institution. In January 2005, MOCA GA moved into the SunTrust Plaza. Two years later, the SunTrust Plaza location closed. In January 2007, MOCA Georgia moved into the downstairs Suite M1 at the TULA Art Center at 75 Bennett Street in Atlanta, Georgia. In order to expand exhibition space, MOCA GA expanded into additional galleries I, II, and III in Suite A2 and Suite O2 of the TULA Art Center in the spring of 2008. MOCA GA now covers about half of the TULA Art Center with additional, exhibition space for the permanent collection.

The museum's permanent collection is composed of hundreds of works by Georgia artists. It is among the few contemporary visual arts museum which pays homage to and promotes local artists. To place its artists in a global context, the museum's exhibitions include artists from around the world (in addition to Georgia artists). The museum's programs promote the visual arts by creating a forum for active exchange between artists and the community.

Operation
MOCA GA is a Georgia non-profit art organization. It relies heavily on membership and community support to operate. MOCA GA has an estimated 9,000 visitors annually. Both modern and cutting-edge contemporary art as well as classic fine art are routinely displayed at the museum and other non-profit art institutions in Georgia. Art organizations offer spaces for music, performance art, other media, education, and other arts in addition to visual arts. MOCA GA's base of operation continues to be held at 75 Bennett Street.

Membership
MOCA GA membership includes free general admission to artist talks. Admission is $8 for non-members, $5 for students and seniors, and no charge to members of the military with ID. Certain events and programming are for members only; other programs are offered to members for free or at a discount.  MOCA GA offers various levels of membership, all including free admission to the museum, exhibition openings, and many special events:  artist talks, MOCA GA outings to other venues, and special programs for members.

Exhibitions
MOCA GA's solo exhibitions exclusively feature Georgia artists, and group exhibitions often include national and international artists alongside those from Georgia.  MOCA GA has mounted more than 120 exhibitions to date. Previous exhibitions include the grand opening exhibition of new sculpture by Martin Emanuel; Artists of the Heath Gallery: 1965–1998, comprising solo exhibitions of works by Herbert Creecy, Cheryl Goldsleger, Kojo Griffin, and Hope Hilton; and special exhibitions from the permanent collection. The exhibitions are accessible online through the museum's website after the exhibits are no longer on display.

In November 2002, the museum mounted Color, Culture, Complexity, an exhibition curated by Ed Spriggs, of the Hammonds House Galleries in Atlanta, and Dan Talley, co-founder of Art Papers magazine and former director of Nexus Contemporary Art Center in Atlanta. The exhibition, an exploration of the history and current conditions of race relations in America, highlights the works of artists from around the country and includes digital photographs by Amalia Amaki (of Atlanta and Delaware), computer-generated images by Marcia Cohen (of Atlanta), a triptych painting by Harry DeLorme (of Savannah), iris prints by Robert B. Stewart (of Atlanta), and conceptually derived digital prints by Lisa McGaughey Tuttle (of Atlanta).

Collections

MOCA GA boasts a permanent collection of nearly 600 works of contemporary art by more than 200 Georgia artists. The core of the collection, which was donated by CGR Advisors and David S. Golden in 2001, features work from the mid-1940s through today. The permanent collection includes a variety of media:  paintings, prints, sculpture, photography, computer, and installation pieces. The Museum of Contemporary Art embraces diverse media and aesthetics in the works of its permanent collection. The museum is a collecting institution and will continue to collect, document, and archive significant works and documentation by Georgia artists and exhibit them for the benefit of the local and global community.

Recent additions
In September 2010, the High Museum announced that it has transferred 21 works by 14 Georgia artists to MOCA GA. The High also transferred more than 700 duplicate publications from its archives to a new reference library currently under development by MOCA GA.  Annette Cone-Skelton chose all works in conjunction with High. The transferred works are:

 Shirley Bolton, "Silent Strings (Jazz Series)," 1974
 Santo Bruno, "Small Function," 1977
 Larry Connaster, "Untitled," 1969
 Herbert Lee Creecy Jr., "Study," 1967, and "Study," 1967
 Lamar Dodd, "Wind on the Coast," 1941; "Sketch for Wind on the Coast," 1944; "The White Door," 1953; and "At the Foot of the Blackland"
 James McRae, "Untitled," 1966
 Charles Mitchell, "Prometheus Bringing Fire Down to the Earth"
 Jarvin Parks, "Homage to the Four Arts"
 Robert Stockton Rogers, "A View of Taxco, Mexico"
 Joseph Schwarz, "Funeral"
 Benjamin Edgar Shute, "Compote with Grapes"
 Howard Thomas, "Reidsville," 1943; "White House and Chickens," 1946; "Get with Red," 1962
 Gladene Tucker," Untitled," 1961
 Ferdinand Warren, "Haystacks and Corn"; "Garden Bouquet," 1952

Education and Resource Center

History
The E/RC began with initial funding from the Forward Arts Foundation with documentation on Georgia artists donated by Annette Cone-Skelton, Inc. in 2000. Interns compiled and updated the donated materials into individual notebooks for each artist. The museum continues to document its own history and maintain the information on the permanent collection artists.

Operation
In the E/RC, MOCA GA's permanent collection, archives, libraries, and other resources are made available to students, scholars, collectors, critics, educators, and the general public. The Center serves as a unique, centralized source for historical documents and archived materials that tell the story of contemporary art in Georgia. These resources are a foundation for the development of a new arts curriculum that engages high school students in the history of Georgia art through visual, biographical, and interactive materials.  Information on the individual artists in MOCA GA's permanent collection is also currently available. The information in the MOCA GA Education/Resource Center includes:

Archives
 Artist Notebooks
 Atlanta College of Art (ACA)
 Atlanta Women's Art Collective
 Girl Vigilantes
 Herbert Creecy Collection
 TABOO

Library
 Genevieve Arnold Book & Catalogue Collection
 Joe Massey Book Collection
 John Howett Book Collection
 MOCA GA Library

Magazines
 Art Forum
 Art in America
 Art Papers
 Miscellaneous Magazines & Journals

Programs & tours
MOCA GA's programming includes artists'/curators' talks, tours of the permanent collections, and interpretive tours of exhibitions for schools and the general public.

Artist/curator talks
At MOCA GA artists are encouraged to engage visitors through regularly scheduled talks regarding current exhibitions. Admissions to artist talks are generally free of charge and provide an opportunity for patrons to meet the artists and ask questions. Artist/curator talks usually accompany the exhibitions.

Café MOCA
Café MOCA is a high-school program where students network with each other and meet professional artists. The program introduces young artists to professional artists and the arts career choices made available to them. Its goal is to build a support network for young artists as they begin their careers. Café MOCA Artists have included Maria Artemis, Lisa Tuttle, Whitney Stansell, Micah Stansell, Eleanor Neal, and Lynn Marshall Linnemeier.

Hartsfield Jackson Atlanta International Airport 
From Oct 17, 2020 - Dec 31, 2022, the MOCA GA shows selections from the Museum of Contemporary Art of Georgia at the International Airport of Atlanta at South Terminal Concourse T.

See also 
 High Museum of Art
 Atlanta Contemporary Art Center
 List of contemporary art museums

References

External links 
 Museum of Contemporary Art of Georgia website

Art museums established in 2000
Art museums and galleries in Georgia (U.S. state)
Contemporary art galleries in the United States
Museums in Atlanta
Museum of Contemporary Art of Georgia